The Southwest Alaska Municipal Conference (SWAMC) is a non-profit regional economic development organization for Southwest Alaska. SWAMC serves three subregions of Southwest Alaska: the Aleutian/Pribilofs, Bristol Bay, and Kodiak.

SWAMC was formed out of the common interests of the region encompassing the Aleutians East Borough, Alaska, the Aleutians West Census Area, the Bristol Bay Borough, the Dillingham Census Area, the Kodiak Island Borough, and the Lake & Peninsula Borough. In 1988, municipal leaders from the region forged a partnership to advocate for the needs of rural communities and the responsible development of the region's core economic sector - commercial seafood harvesting and processing.

SWAMC is a member of the State of Alaska's ARDOR Program.

External links
 

1988 establishments in Alaska
Aleutians East Borough, Alaska
Aleutians West Census Area, Alaska
Bristol Bay Borough, Alaska
Dillingham Census Area, Alaska
Economic development organizations in the United States
Economy of Alaska
Kodiak Island Borough, Alaska
Lake and Peninsula Borough, Alaska
Non-profit organizations based in Anchorage, Alaska
Organizations established in 1988